Massachusetts II was a small sloop operated by the Revenue-Marine used in the collection of customs duties. She was completed in June 1793 and replaced , one of the first ten cutters of the Revenue-Marine, when it was determined that the older ship was too large and slow to perform her assigned tasks. Massachusetts II was constructed by Adna Bates of Cohasset, Massachusetts for a cost of 1,600. Her area of operation was along the Massachusetts coast as a smaller less expensive replacement to the original Massachusetts. When the original Massachusetts was sold at auction, the second and third mates were discharged and Massachusetts II was crewed by two officers and four sailors.

Massachusetts II was sold in June 1804 for 900.

Notes
Footnotes

Citations

References used

External links
 Massachusetts, 1793, — United States Coast Guard Historian's Office website

Ships of the United States Revenue Cutter Service
1793 ships
Ships built in Massachusetts
Cohasset, Massachusetts